Károly Kós (born Károly Kosch; 16 December 1883 – 25 August 1977) was a Hungarian architect, writer, illustrator, ethnologist and politician of Austria-Hungary and Romania.

Biography 
Born as Károly Kosch in Temesvár, Austria-Hungary (now Timișoara, Romania), he studied engineering at the Royal University of Technology József, and only afterwards turned towards architecture (graduating from the Budapest Architecture School in 1907). Already during his studies and at the start of his career, he had a special interest for the historical and traditional folk architecture, and made study trips to Kalotaszeg and the Székely Land.

In 1909, his project for the Roman Catholic church in Zebegény, in 1909 the Óbuda Reformed parochial building, and in 1910 the Budapest Zoo complex (with Dezső Zrumeczky), were carried out. During the 1910s, he completed the Reformed Rooster Church in Kolozsvár (a city later known as Cluj or Cluj-Napoca) and the hospital in Sepsiszentgyörgy (Sfântu Gheorghe). At the time, his style was influenced by the Vienna Secession and Art Nouveau.

In 1914, at the start of World War I, Kós moved to Sztána (Stana). He was drafted the following year, but soon discharged on request from the Ministry of Culture. Between 1917 and 1918, he was sent on a study trip to Istanbul. In 1918, Kós was asked to be a professor of the College for Applied Arts of Budapest, but he declined, wishing to return to Transylvania.

He lived off commissions and started a political career, choosing, unlike many in the Hungarian community, to accept the Romanian Kingdom's administration in the region as a given, while engaging in active opposition inside its legal framework (and authoring a manifesto calling on others to do the same). Alongside Lajos Albrecht and others, he was one of the founders of the Transylvanian People's Party in 1921 — the group later formed the Magyar Party. Kós also edited its illustrated political journal Vasárnap.

In 1924, he and several of his friends founded a publishing house under the name Erdélyi Szépmíves Céh ("Transylvanian Guild of Fine Arts"). From 1931, he was editor of the Erdélyi Helikon, and manager of the Miklós Barabás Guild (an independent interest group of Hungarian artists in Romania).

In 1944 his house in Sztána (part of Northern Transylvania) was plundered, and he fled to Kolozsvár, where he rejoined his family. He was director of the Transylvanian Hungarian Economic Association. As a politician, he was the president of the Hungarian People's Union (Magyar Népi Szövetség, MNSz), and afterwards member of the Assembly of Deputies (1946–48).

Kós taught at the College for Agriculture in Cluj until 1953, filling the post of the dean in 1945, and contributed to the journal Világosság between 1948–49. He died in Cluj.

Buildings designed

1908-1910
Reformed Parish Church, Óbuda
Roman Catholic Church, Zebegény; with Béla Jánszky
Zoo buildings, Budapest; with Dezső Zrumeczky
the Varjuvar, Kós' house in Sztana
1910-1913
Városmajor Street, Budapest; with Dénes Györgyi
Wekerle estate, Budapest
Székely National Museum, Sfântu Gheorghe (Sepsiszentgyörgy)
Church with the Rooster, Cluj
1930s and 1940s
Kós' house in Miskolc
Exhibition Hall, Cluj
King Matthias House restoration, Cluj
Milk hall, Mera village, Baciu

Novels
Varjú nemzetség ("The Varjú Kin", 1925)
A Gálok ("The Gál Family", 1930)
Országépítő ("The Country Founder", 1934)

See also
Transylvanianism

Notes

References
 Lucian Nastasă, Levente Salat (eds.), Maghiarii din România şi etica minoritară (1920-1940), at the Ethnocultural Diversity Resource Center. Open Society Foundation Romania; retrieved October 23, 2007:
Introductory studies by Lucian Nastasă and Levente Salat
Károly Kós, "Glasul care strigă"

External links
 Kós Károly House at Stana-Varjúvár

1883 births
1977 deaths
Politicians from Timișoara
Hungarian architects
Hungarian art critics
Hungarian journalists
Hungarian male novelists
Hungarian people of World War II
Hungarian Calvinist and Reformed Christians
Hungarian people of German descent
Romanian Calvinist and Reformed Christians
Romanian people of Hungarian descent
Academic staff of the University of Agricultural Sciences and Veterinary Medicine of Cluj-Napoca
Architects from Timișoara
Romanian art critics
Romanian magazine editors
Romanian male novelists
Members of the Chamber of Deputies (Romania)
Art Nouveau architects
Recipients of the Order of the Star of the Romanian Socialist Republic
20th-century Romanian novelists
20th-century Romanian male writers
20th-century Hungarian male writers
20th-century journalists